The 2001 Miami Fusion season was the fourth and final season of the Miami Fusion's existence. They competed in Major League Soccer and played their home matches at Lockhart Stadium in Fort Lauderdale, Florida. They won the club's first and only trophy by securing the Supporters' Shield as the team with the best regular season record. Outside of MLS, they competed in the U.S. Open Cup where they were eliminated by Columbus Crew in the Third Round. Due to financial problems, the club folded in January 2002.

Non-competitive

Friendlies

Competitive

Major League Soccer

Match results

MLS Cup Playoffs

Quarterfinals

Semifinals

U.S. Open Cup

First-team squad
Squad at end of season

Left club during season

References

Miami Fusion
Miami Fusion
Miami Fusion
2001